Vaasanpuistikko (Swedish: Vasaskvären, unofficial name Vaasanaukio), meaning "Vaasa park", is an area in Helsinki, Finland, surrounded by the streets of Helsinginkatu, Vaasanpolku and Pengerpolku around the western entrance to the Sörnäinen metro station, near the so-called Sörnäinen curve. Even though Vaasanpuistikko is located in the neighbourhood of Alppiharju, it is commonly thought of as a part of Kallio. Vaasanpuistikko is connected with Vaasankatu.

Around Vaasanpuistikko are located the Sörnäinen metro station, a pawn shop, a self-defense school, a gym, a driving school and an S-market shop. There are numerous bars, pizzerias and other restaurants located nearby.

Helsinki city council member Kimmo Helistö made a proposal in 2007 to rename the square as "Arto Mellerin aukio" after the poet Arto Melleri, but the proposal was not supported.

Vaasanpuistikko is sometimes humorously referred to with the nicknames "Piritori" ("Amphetamine square") and "Ikuisen vapun aukio" ("Square of the eternal Walpurgis Night"). As of 2022, there have been concerns about increasing substance abuse and restlessness on the square and on the streets nearby.

References

External links
 
 City council proposal to improve the area of Vaasanpuistikko and the Sörnäinen metro station, archived on 22 April 2012
 Yle Elävä Arkisto: Ikuisen vapun Piritori

Squares in Helsinki